Notion, previously stylized as NOTION, is a computer software program for music composition and performance, created by NOTION Music (formerly Virtuosoworks) of Greensboro, North Carolina, now owned by PreSonus. It is available for Microsoft Windows, macOS and iOS.

Composition
Notion supports composition using a computer keyboard/mouse, MIDI keyboard, MIDI guitar, MIDI file, MusicXML file, or handwriting recognition. It automatically handles aspects of music notation such as stem direction and alignment of rhythmic values,  and supports the input and output of notation in tablature form, synchronized with the standard music notation.

It includes an audio mixer to set volume levels, perform panning, and add effects such as equalization, compression and reverb.

From version 3 onward, it supports ReWire, third-party VST effects and other third-party sound libraries, including presets for products from the Vienna Symphonic Library, EastWest, Miroslav Philharmonik, and Garritan Personal Orchestra.

Playback and performance
Notion's sample playback library was recorded at Abbey Road by the London Symphony Orchestra. The playback engine has options for real-time interpretation of tempi, articulations, and performance techniques.

Users can capture playback in wav digital audio files for transfer to CD or digital audio workstation, or for conversion to other audio formats such as mp3 or wma.

Integration with Studio One 
Starting with version 3.3 in 2016, the Studio One DAW (also developed by PreSonus) is integrated with Notion version 6 and above, allowing the two applications to perform real-time audio and MIDI streaming (via either ReWire or PreSonus' own UCNET protocol) to share audio, note, track, VST and score data, either with both applications running on the same computer, or on multiple computers connected to a network.

This integration was expanded further by Notion versions 6.4 (May 2018, following the release of the Chord track for Studio One in version 4), allowing the transfer of chord-level information between the two applications; and version 6.5 (January 2019), which enabled the automatic translation of drum tracks into standard percussion notation.

See also
 PreSonus
Studio One (software)
 Progression (software)
 List of music software

Notes

External links
 

Scorewriters